Sant Feliu de Barruera is a roman church  situated in Erill la Vall, in the territory of Vall de Boí, a commune in the valley with the same name and in Comarca of Alta Ribagorça in the north of Province of Lleida and the autonomous communities of Catalonia in Spain.

History 
Like Sant Climent, Taüll, Sant Joan de Boí, Sant Feliu de Barruera or Santa Maria de Taüll, the date of construction of Sant Feliu is believed to be in 11th century.

In November 2000, it was included in the world heritage site of UNESCO with eight other Catalan Romanesque Churches of the Vall de Boí.

Architecture

Sculpture

References 

Churches in Catalonia
Romanesque architecture in Catalonia
Catalan art
Alta Ribagorça
World Heritage Sites in Catalonia
Vall de Boí